Peter St Clair-Erskine, 7th Earl of Rosslyn,  (born 31 March 1958), known professionally as Peter Loughborough, is a British peer. He is Lord Steward of the Royal Household  and Personal Secretary to Their Majesties, as well as a former Metropolitan Police Commander. The Earl's lands include Rosslyn Chapel.

Background and education
Lord Rosslyn was educated at Ludgrove School, Eton College and the University of Bristol. He inherited his titles in 1977, and took his seat in the House of Lords on 15 January 1980. Ahead of the passage of the House of Lords Act 1999 which excluded most hereditary peers he was elected as one of the 28 peers in the Crossbench group who were to remain in the House of Lords.

As of 2022, in 43 years in the House of Lords he had only spoken once and voted five times, each in relation to reform of the Lords.

Career
Rosslyn joined the Metropolitan Police Service in 1980 on the recommendation of his third cousin Lord Strathnaver, a former detective and heir apparent of the 24th Countess of Sutherland. He reached the rank of chief inspector in the 1990s. In 1994 he led the undercover Operation Troodos, a successful crackdown on drug dealers in west London, including the drug supplier of the Marquess of Blandford, later Duke of Marlborough. From 2003 to 2014, he was head of the Royalty and Diplomatic Protection Department (since amalgamated into Protection Command). He received the King's Police Medal (then the Queen's Police Medal) in the 2009 New Year Honours and was reputedly the Queen's "favourite policeman".

In March 2014, Lord Rosslyn was appointed as Master of the Household to The Prince of Wales, and The Duchess of Cornwall at Clarence House.

On 29 September 2014, Lord Rosslyn was appointed a Commander of the Royal Victorian Order (CVO) upon relinquishing his appointment as Head of Royalty and Specialist Protection Department.

On 22 February 2023, he was appointed Lord Steward of the Household, succeeding the 17th Earl of Dalhousie, and Personal Secretary to Their Majesties by Charles III.

Family
He married Helen Watters in 1982 and they have two sons and two daughters, including actress Lady Alice St Clair-Erskine.

Lady Rosslyn runs the London Original Print Fair.

Honours

References

External links

1958 births
Living people
Alumni of the University of Bristol
Commanders of the Royal Victorian Order
Crossbench hereditary peers
Earls in the Peerage of the United Kingdom
Members of the Household of the Prince of Wales
Metropolitan Police chief officers
People educated at Eton College
Scottish recipients of the Queen's Police Medal
Metropolitan Police recipients of the Queen's Police Medal
Peter
People educated at Ludgrove School
Hereditary peers elected under the House of Lords Act 1999